The Macchi MB.323 was an Italian single-engine basic training monoplane designed and built by Macchi. No orders were placed and only a prototype was built.

Design and development
Designed as a basic trainer to complement the M.416 in Italian military service, the MB.323 first flew in 1952. It was a single-engine, low-wing cantilever monoplane powered by a nose-mounted Pratt & Whitney Wasp radial engine and a retractable tailwheel landing gear. It had two tandem cockpits covered by a sliding one-piece canopy. The type was evaluated against the Fiat G.49 which was preferred by the air force and the MB.323 did not enter production.

Operators

Italian Air Force operated two aircraft for evaluation test

Specifications

See also

References

 
 

M.B.323
1950s Italian military trainer aircraft
Single-engined tractor aircraft
Low-wing aircraft
Aircraft first flown in 1952